Wing Yee Football Team, currently known as Wing Yee Property for sponsorship reasons, is a Hong Kong football club which currently competes in the Hong Kong First Division.

History
Wing Yee joined the Hong Kong Third Division "A" League in 2006–07 season by borrowing the league membership of HK City Athletics Promotion Centre Ltd. The team was promoted to Hong Kong Second Division after the 2007–08 Hong Kong Third Division "A" League season. 

In the 2008–09 and 2009–10 seasons, the team finished at 4th and 5th respectively in the Second Division.

References

External links
Wing Yee at HKFA.com

Football clubs in Hong Kong
Hong Kong First Division League
Association football clubs established in 2006
2006 establishments in Hong Kong